The first lady of California or first partner of California is the spouse of the governor of California. The role of the spouse of the governor of California has never been codified or officially defined. The spouse figures prominently in the social life of the state, and some spouses have been assisted with a staff in the Executive Office of the Governor. As of 2022, all the state's governors have been men, and not all of them were married while in office.

Jennifer Siebel Newsom is the current spouse of the governor of California concurrent with the governor's term in office. Her predecessors held the informal but accepted title of First Lady but she chooses First Partner. Governor Newton Booth wed after he retired from politics, and Washington Bartlett was a lifelong bachelor. Jerry Brown was a bachelor throughout his initial gubernatorial service but was married when he once again became governor decades later.

Prior to entering politics, Jane Stanford joined her husband Leland Stanford to help him run a mercantile business in San Francisco. The couple co-founded Stanford University. Bernice Layne Brown, wife of Governor Pat Brown,  was also the mother of Governor Jerry Brown.  Nancy Reagan was a career actress before her husband Ronald Reagan was first elected governor, and then President of the United States.

There are five living former first ladies: Gloria Deukmejian, widow of George Deukmejian; Gayle Wilson, wife of Pete Wilson; Sharon Davis, wife of Gray Davis; Maria Shriver, ex-wife of Arnold Schwarzenegger; and Anne Gust Brown, wife of Jerry Brown.


List of first ladies and partners of California

See also
First lady

References

Bibliography

Further reading 

Lists of people from California
Spouses of California politicians
Lists of spouses
American political hostesses
American women in politics
Women's social titles